Slobodan Aligrudić (15 October 1934 – 13 August 1985) was a Serbian actor known for some of the most memorable roles in the history of former Yugoslav cinema.

Biography
Aligrudić was born in Bitola. He earned prominence as a thespian in Belgrade's Atelje 212 Theatre, but to a wider audience he is best known for his memorable character portrayals on film. Some of those roles were achieved in classic films of former Yugoslav cinema, including Love Affair, or the Case of the Missing Switchboard Operator. Due to his distinctly coarse look, most of his roles were stern authority figures, but he always managed to give them a breath of humanity. One of the best examples is Maho, a father character in Emir Kusturica's 1981 coming-of-age drama Do You Remember Dolly Bell?.

Aligrudić worked with Kusturica again in his 1985 celebrated drama When Father Was Away on Business, in which he played an UDBA agent in charge of protagonist's "re-education". He died in Gradac (SR Croatia) shortly after that film won Palme d'Or at the Cannes Film Festival and shortly after the death of his long-time colleague Zoran Radmilović. This event led many former Yugoslav film critics to say that "heaven had received a huge boost".

His son Miloš Aligrudić is a high-ranking official of Vojislav Koštunica's Democratic Party of Serbia.

Partial filmography

Solaja (1955) - Skojevac
Subotom uvece (1957) - Mladic (segment "Na kosavi") (uncredited)
San (1966) - Milovan (voice, uncredited)
Love Affair, or the Case of the Missing Switchboard Operator (1967) - Ahmed, sanitarni inspektor
Kad budem mrtav i beo (1967) - Upravnik Milutin
Bekstva (1968) - Albert
Quo vadis Zivorade?! (1968) - General
Zaseda (1969) - Jotic
Rani radovi (1969)
Bube u glavi (1970) - Silovatelj
I Bog stvori kafansku pevacicu (1972) - Direktor hotela II
Pukovnikovica (1972) - Kaplar II
Zuta (1973) - Milicioner II
Otpisani (1974) - Skale
Naivko (1975) - Pura
Povratak otpisanih (1976) - Drug Selja
Specijalno vaspitanje (1977) - Komandir milicije
Ljubavni zivot Budimira Trajkovica (1977) - Direktor OOUR-a
Miris poljskog cveca (1977) - Inspektor za krvne delikte
Nacionalna klasa (1979) - Funkcioner Vidoje
Srecna porodica (1979)
Who's Singin' Over There? (1980) - Porucnik
Snovi, zivot, smrt Filipa Filipovica (1980)
Erogena zona (1981) - Milicioner
Do You Remember Dolly Bell? (1981) - Otac
Kraljevski voz (1981) - Policajac Rapajic
Decko koji obecava (1981) - Psihijatar
Idemo dalje (1982) - Skolski nadzornik
13. jul (1982) - Covek sa kutijom sa mackama
Variola vera (1982) - Drug Vlada
Veliki transport (1983) - Novoverac Rade
When Father Was Away on Business (1985) -  Ostoja Cekic
Indijsko ogledalo (1985) - Cale
Brisani Prostor (1985) - main  police inspector Cica

References

External links

1934 births
1985 deaths
People from Bitola
Serbian male actors
20th-century Serbian male actors